The 2017 Women's Junior Pan-American Volleyball Cup was the fourth edition of the bi-annual women's volleyball tournament. Nine teams participated in this edition held in San José, Costa Rica.

Competing nations

Competition format
 Nine teams will be divided into three pools. In the group stage each pool will play round robin.
 The two best teams from the first rank team of each pool after group stage will receive byes into the semifinals.
 The remaining first-rank team will play in the quarterfinals along with the second-rank teams.

Preliminary round
All times are in Costa Rica Standard Time (UTC−06:00)

Group A

Group B

Group C

Final round

Championship bracket

9th place match

Quarterfinals

7th place match

Semifinals

5th place match

3rd place match

Final

Final standing

Individual awards

Most Valuable Player
 
Best Scorer
 
Best Setter
 
Best Opposite
 
Best Outside Hitters
 
 
Best Middle Blockers
 
 
Best Libero
 
Best Server
 
Best Receiver
 
Best Digger

References

External links

Women's Pan-American Volleyball Cup
Pan-American
International sports competitions hosted by Costa Rica
2017 in Costa Rican sport
May 2017 sports events in North America